Ciccio Barbi (19 January 1919 – 26 November 1992) was an Italian film actor.

Selected filmography

 The Last Wagon (1943) - Young Friend of Toto (uncredited)
 Angelina (1947) - (uncredited)
 Auguri e figli maschi! (1951) - Vinicio Paciottini
 The Steamship Owner (1951) - Un alpino
 Finalmente libero! (1953) - Pasquale Galli
 Papà Pacifico (1954) - The Man identifying the ring
 Cuore di mamma (1954) - Police Commissioner Vargas
 Il seduttore (1954) - Ragionier Abele
 An American in Rome (1954) - Armando, impresario (uncredited)
 La campana di San Giusto (1954)
 A Hero of Our Times (1955) - Employee
 The Belle of Rome (1955) - Il parroco
 Accadde al penitenziario (1955) - Un automobilista in lite (uncredited)
 Bravissimo (1955) - Barbi - the Lawyer (uncredited)
 Roman Tales (1955) - The Plump Policeman near the Stadium (uncredited)
 Torna piccina mia! (1955) - Poliziotto
 Guardia, guardia scelta, brigadiere e maresciallo (1956) - French Tourist
 Nero's Weekend (1956) - Ancieto
 Tempo di villeggiatura (1956) - The Production Manager
 Porta un bacione a Firenze (1956) - Virgilio, il vigile
 Peccato di castità (1956)
 Parola di ladro (1957) - Impresario
 Nights of Cabiria (1957) - Man on the Stage (uncredited)
 The Love Specialist (1957) - The chubby 'Mangino' for the Aquila Contrada (uncredited)
 Amore e chiacchiere (Salviamo il panorama) (1958) - (uncredited)
 Il marito (1958) - Un amico
 Domenica è sempre domenica (1958) - The Priest
 Quando gli angeli piangono (1958) - L'allenatore di boxe
 Rascel marine (1958) - Marine
 L'amore nasce a Roma (1958) - padre di Lello
 Ricordati di Napoli (1958) - The 'Taxi Girls' Manager (uncredited)
 Il segreto delle rose (1958) - Davide
 Arriva la banda (1959)
 Fantasmi e ladri (1959)
 I tartassati (1959) - Il brigadiere Bardi
 Un canto nel deserto (1959)
 World of Miracles (1959) - Il commendatore Berbloni
 The Moralist (1959) - The Police Commissioner at 'Caracas'
 La cento chilometri (1959) - The Soaked Mason (uncredited)
 La nipote Sabella (1959) - The Stationmaster Nicola
 Juke box - Urli d'amore (1959)
 Audace colpo dei soliti ignoti (1959) - Carabiniere (uncredited)
 Simpatico mascalzone (1959) - Rutilio
 Roulotte e roulette (1959)
 Fountain of Trevi (1960) - Tax collector (uncredited)
 Everybody Go Home (1960) - Soldato
 Mariti in pericolo (1960) - Avvocato
 Ferragosto in bikini (1960) - Bonaccorsi assistant (uncredited)
 Girl with a Suitcase (1961) - Crosia
 Gli scontenti (1961) - Il medico
 5 marines per 100 ragazze (1961) - Man firing Checco and Salvatore (uncredited)
 Gli attendenti (1961)
 Scandali al mare (1961) - Cuoco
 Le magnifiche 7 (1961)
 I magnifici tre (1961)
 Boccaccio '70 (1962) - Engineer in the Car (uncredited)
 Maciste il gladiatore più forte del mondo (1962)
 Carmen di Trastevere (1962) - Vincenzo's Accomplice in Black (uncredited)
 Il mio amico Benito (1962) - Sor Achille (uncredited)
 I soliti rapinatori a Milano (1963)
 Vino, whisky e acqua salata (1963)
 Los dinamiteros (1964) - Martínez - vendedor de lencería
 The Girl Who Couldn't Say No (1969) - Passenger on Train
 Orazi e curiazi 3-2 (1977) - Curiazio (uncredited) (final film role)

References

External links
 

1919 births
1992 deaths
Italian male film actors